Richland Township is an inactive township in Ozark County, in the U.S. state of Missouri.

Richland Township was erected in 1860, taking its name from the local Richland family.

References

Townships in Missouri
Townships in Ozark County, Missouri